Poreče, Porečie or Porečje or Poreč, is a region in North Macedonia which includes the Makedonski Brod Municipality, and the western part of the Prilep Municipality.

During the Balkan wars, Serbian chetniks massacred 50 Albanian families in the Poreče village of Drenovo. The village of Brod was considered by Serbian authorities to be a "haven for evildoers of Kičevo". Its possible that Haki Efendi of Teqe, a contemporary Albanian political leader was from the village of Brod, which at the time had a Bektashi tekke.

References

Geography of North Macedonia
Makedonski Brod Municipality
Prilep Municipality